A province is the second-largest administrative division in Chile with 56 in total. The largest administrative division in Chile is that of a region with 16 in total.

Each provincial presidential delegation (delegación presidencial provincial) is headed by a provincial presidential delegate (delegado presidencial provincial) appointed by the President. The governor exercises their powers in accordance with instructions from the regional presidential delegate (delegado presidencial regional). The provincial delegate is advised by the Provincial Economic and Social Council (Consejo Económico y Social Provincial or CESPRO). No provincial presidential delegations exist in those provinces where the regional capital is located; its functions were merged with those of the regional presidential delegate.

The country's provinces are further divided into 346 communes which are administered by an alcalde and municipal council.

Until 1976, a province was the main administrative division in Chile, with 25 provinces: Aconcagua, Aysén (since 1929), Antofagasta, Arauco, Atacama, Biobío, Cautín, Chiloé, Colchagua, Concepción, Coquimbo, Curicó, Linares, Llanquihue, Magallanes (since 1929), Malleco, Maule, Ñuble, O'Higgins, Osorno (since 1940), Santiago, Talca, Tarapacá, Valdivia, and Valparaíso. Despite being claimed by Chile, Antártica Chilena is not generally recognized as part of Chile due to being located in Antarctica.

List of provinces
The following table gives each province, its capital, surface area and 2002 population according to the National Statistics Institute.

See also
 Administrative divisions of Chile

References

External links
 Decreto Ley 2.868
 

 
Provinces
Provinces, Chile
Subdivisions of Chile